John Seru (born 12 January 1964) is a Fijian actor and former professional wrestler.

Biography 
Seru was trained by father and son Boris and Dean Malenko at the renowned Malenko Wrestling Academy in Tampa, Florida (1994). He is best known as "Vulcan" in the Australian version of TV series Gladiators, as well as joining the British Gladiators team in Seasons 7 and 8. He is also known for his part in the James Bond film, The World Is Not Enough, where he plays henchman Gabor. He owns and runs a wrestling school, coffee/wine bar, fitness center, and fitness shop that he has been running for 18 years in Menai, Sydney with his family.

Championships and accomplishments
International Wrestling Australia
IWA Heavyweight Championship (2 time)

Filmography

References

External links 
 
 
 Interview with Vulcan - News.com.au

Australian male television actors
1964 births
Living people
Australian male professional wrestlers
Australian expatriates in England
Fijian male film actors
I-Taukei Fijian people
Fijian professional wrestlers
20th-century Australian male actors
21st-century Australian male actors
Australian company founders